Dispersion is the second album by High Rise, released on December 25, 1992 through P.S.F. Records.

Track listing

Personnel 
High Rise
Asahito Nanjo – vocals, bass guitar
Munehiro Narita – guitar, cover art
Yuro Ujiie – drums
Production and additional personnel
High Rise – production
Yuichi Jibiki – photography
Kenji Nakazawa – engineering, mixing
Takewo Yamamoto – engineering

References

External links 
 

1992 albums
High Rise (band) albums
P.S.F. Records albums